Timo Helbling (born July 21, 1981) is a Swiss former professional ice hockey defenceman who played in the National League (NL) for HC Davos, Kloten Flyers, HC Lugano, HC Fribourg-Gottéron, SC Bern, EV Zug, SC Rapperswil-Jona Lakers, Oulun Kärpät of the Finish Liiga, the Tampa Bay Lightning and the Washington Capitals of the National Hockey League (NHL). Helbling was originally drafted 162nd overall by the Nashville Predators in the 1999 NHL Entry Draft.

Playing career
As a youth, Helbling played in the 1995 Quebec International Pee-Wee Hockey Tournament with a team from Zürich. Helbling was drafted in the 6th round, 162nd overall by the Nashville Predators in the 1999 NHL Entry Draft. In the 2005–06 season, Helbling played 60 games for the Springfield Falcons of the AHL before he was recalled to the Tampa Bay Lightning to make his NHL debut.

Helbling signed with the Washington Capitals for the 2006–07 season, playing primarily with AHL affiliate, the Hershey Bears, before he was traded by the Capitals to the Sabres along with Dainius Zubrus for a first round pick and Jiri Novotny on February 27, 2007. Helbling was then assigned to the affiliate of the Sabres, the Rochester Americans.

Following the season, Timo returned to his native Switzerland, signing with HC Lugano. But revoke his deal with HC Lugano and make remaining season contract with Oulun Kärpät contract includes trial period until Christmas brake. Helbling plays his first game in Oulun Kärpät on November 16, 2010. During the World Hockey Championships 2010 Helbling caused confusion by getting in an altercation with Germany's coaches after losing a game against them.

After two seasons with HC Fribourg-Gottéron, Helbling was traded with a year remaining on his contract to fellow NLA club, SC Bern in exchange for Ryan Gardner on April 2, 2015.

On September 11, 2017, Helbling was suspended for 6 games and fined CHF 5,400 for a hit on a referee during a game against HC Davos on September 8, 2017.

On June 18, 2018, Helbling joined freshly promoted SC Rapperswil-Jona Lakers on a one-year deal worth CHF 450,000. In the 2018-19 season, Helbling helped the Lakers remain in the NL, posting 1 goal and 4 points in 26 games before concluding his 621-game National League career at the conclusion of the season on April 9, 2019.

Career statistics

Regular season and playoffs

International

References

External links

1981 births
Living people
SC Bern players
HC Davos players
HC Fribourg-Gottéron players
Hershey Bears players
Oulun Kärpät players
HC Lugano players
Milwaukee Admirals players
Milwaukee Admirals (IHL) players
SC Rapperswil-Jona Lakers players
Rochester Americans players
Springfield Falcons players
Swiss ice hockey defencemen
Tampa Bay Lightning players
Washington Capitals players
Windsor Spitfires players
EV Zug players
Sportspeople from Basel-Stadt